is a Japanese actress and singer. She has an older sister named Ai Maeda.

She is perhaps best known in the west for her role as Noriko Nakagawa in the controversial 2000 film Battle Royale, which she reprised for its sequel Battle Royale II: Requiem. She graduated from Hosei University in 2008.

Filmography

Films
Gamera 2: Attack of Legion, (1996)
School Ghost Stories 2, (1996), Nanako Imai
School Ghost Stories 3, (1997), Mayuko Fujii
Pride (1998), Kimie Tōjō
Gamera 3: Awakening of Irys, (1999)
Battle Royale, (2000)
High School Girl's Friend, (2001)
Godzilla, Mothra and King Ghidorah: Giant Monsters All-Out Attack, (2001)
Genji: A Thousand-Year Love, (2002)
Battle Royale II: Requiem, (2003)
Out of This World, (2004)
Linda Linda Linda, (2005), Kyoko
Harami, (2005)
Saishuu Heiki Kanojo (Saikano), (2006)
Mizu ni Sumu Hana, (2006)
4 Shimai Tantei Dan, (2008)
Aokigahara, (2012)
I Never Shot Anyone, (2020)
A Madder Red, (2021)
Kawa no Nagare ni (2021)

Television
Aoi Tokugawa Sandai, Sadako (2000)
Fūrin Kazan, Ritsu (2007)
Gochisōsan, Sakurako Muroi (2013)
Shinya Shokudō, Sachiko's Sister (2014)
Kuroshoin no Rokubei (2018), Tenshō-in Atsuhime
The Return (2020)

Anime
Cosmic Baton Girl Comet-san, Comet (2001)
The Cat Returns, Yuki (2002)

Discography

Studio albums
 1999: Winter Tales
 2000: Boys be... original soundtrack
 2005: we are PARAN MAUM -- Paran Maum (as drummer)
 2005: Linda Linda Linda original soundtrack  (as drummer of Paran Maum)

Singles
 1999: Gomen Ne
 2000: Daijōbu (part of the Boys be... original soundtrack)
 2000: Genki no SHOWER (This song can also be found on the original Japanese Yu-Gi-Oh! anime soundtrack.)

Awards
 2001: Newcomer of the Year, Awards of the Japanese Academy: Battle Royale

References

External links
 
 Aki Maeda Fansite

1985 births
Japanese film actresses
Japanese television actresses
Japanese voice actresses
Living people
20th-century Japanese actresses
21st-century Japanese actresses
Singers from Tokyo
21st-century Japanese singers